The 2008–09 AHL season was the 73rd season of the American Hockey League. 29 teams each played 80 games in the regular season, which ran from October 8 until April 12.

Team and NHL affiliation changes
The Iowa Stars are renamed and are now called the Iowa Chops, and the Anaheim Ducks have replaced the Dallas Stars as the team's NHL affiliate.

The Dallas Stars have no AHL affiliate this year, with the Texas Stars (based in Austin) to become their affiliate for the 2009–10 season.

On April 28, 2009, it was announced that two teams would be relocated for the 2009–10 season: the Quad City Flames would move to Abbotsford, BC, and the Philadelphia Phantoms would relocate to Glens Falls, NY.

Affiliation changes

Standings
Blue indicates team has clinched division.
Green indicates team has clinched a playoff spot.

Eastern Conference

Western Conference

Scoring leaders
Note: GP = Games played; G = Goals; A = Assists; Pts = Points; PIM = Penalty minutes

Calder Cup playoffs

In each division, the fourth-place team will play the first-place team in the division semifinals, while the second-place team plays the third-place team.

Bracket 

 A is short for Atlantic Division
 E is short for East Division
 N is short for North Division
 W is short for West Division

All Star Classic
The 22nd AHL All-Star Classic was played in Worcester, Massachusetts, on January 26, 2009, with the PlanetUSA All-Stars defeating the Canadian All-Stars 14–11 after scoring nine goals in the third period to come back from an 8–5 deficit. Corey Locke scored four goals for the Canadian All-Stars, while Jeff Taffe had a hat-trick for the PlanetUSA All-Stars.
The host club was the Worcester Sharks. The 2009 event in Worcester marked the fourth time since 1995 that the AHL All-Star Classic took place in New England. The AHL All-Star Game was last held in Massachusetts in 1959 at the Eastern States Coliseum in West Springfield.

* indicates player was called up to his NHL team. ** indicates player was named to All-Star team, but missed game due to injury. † indicates player was named as a replacement due to callups or injury.

Trophy and award winners

Team awards

See also
List of AHL seasons
 2008 in ice hockey
 2009 in ice hockey

References

AHL official site
AHL Hall of Fame
HockeyDB
Historic standings and statistics - at Internet Hockey Database

 
2
2
American Hockey League seasons